Rollins Plays for Bird is a 1957 album by jazz saxophonist Sonny Rollins, recorded for the Prestige label, featuring performances by Rollins with Kenny Dorham, Wade Legge, George Morrow and Max Roach on material associated with Charlie Parker.

Reception

The AllMusic review by Michael G. Nastos describes the album as "[a] disappointment in terms of the division of labor, and not the merging of titans jazz lovers would have wished for, this recording still provides a great deal of high level music that could have been so much more".

Track listing
All compositions by Sonny Rollins except as indicated.

 "Bird Medley: I Remember You/My Melancholy Baby/Old Folks/They Can't Take That Away From Me/Just Friends/My Little Suede Shoes/Star Eyes" (Johnny Mercer, Victor Schertzinger/Ernie Burnett, George A. Norton/Dedette Lee Hill, Willard Robison/George Gershwin, Ira Gershwin/John Klenner, Sam M. Lewis/Charlie Parker/Gene DePaul, Don Raye) – 26:55
 "Kids Know" – 11:39
 "I've Grown Accustomed to Her Face" (Alan Jay Lerner, Frederick Loewe) – 4:52
 "The House I Live In" (Lewis Allan, Earl Robinson) – 9:21 Bonus track on the RVG Prestige edition

Personnel
Sonny Rollins – tenor saxophone
Kenny Dorham – trumpet (except 3)
Wade Legge – piano
George Morrow – bass
Max Roach – drums

References

1957 albums
Prestige Records albums
Sonny Rollins albums
Albums recorded at Van Gelder Studio
Albums produced by Bob Weinstock